Fabrício dos Santos Silva (born 11 January 1987), simply known as Fabrício, is a Brazilian footballer who plays for Esporte Clube Água Santa. Mainly a left back, he can also play as a midfielder.

On 2 April 2015, Fabrício was sent off whilst playing for Internacional in a 1–0 victory against Ypiranga; while in possession of the ball, Fabrício received boos from his own fans, which caused him to respond by sticking his middle finger to them in retaliation. After receiving the red card from referee Luis Teixeira, Fabrício took his shirt off and threw it to the ground, before he stormed off the pitch screaming "I'm leaving". Internacional suspended him for his actions and he was loaned to the Brazilian club Cruzeiro six days later.

Honours
Internacional
 Recopa Sudamericana: 2011
 Campeonato Gaúcho: 2012, 2013, 2014

Palmeiras
 Campeonato Brasileiro Série A: 2016

References

External links

1987 births
Living people
Brazilian footballers
Association football defenders
Campeonato Brasileiro Série A players
Campeonato Brasileiro Série B players
Sport Club Corinthians Paulista players
Ituano FC players
Rio Branco Esporte Clube players
Esporte Clube Santo André players
Atlético Monte Azul players
Associação Portuguesa de Desportos players
Sport Club Internacional players
Cruzeiro Esporte Clube players
Sociedade Esportiva Palmeiras players
CR Vasco da Gama players
Esporte Clube Vitória players
Esporte Clube Água Santa players
Footballers from São Paulo